The 2008 CONCACAF Champions' Cup was the 43rd edition of the annual international club football competition held in the CONCACAF region (North America, Central America and the Caribbean), the CONCACAF Champions' Cup. It was the final edition under this name and format, being replaced by the CONCACAF Champions League starting from the 2008–09 season.

It determined that year's club champion of association football in the CONCACAF region. The tournament was also a qualifying event for the 2008 FIFA Club World Cup.

CONCACAF held the draw on December 18, 2007, to establish the matchups and bracket.

Qualified teams

North American zone
 Pachuca – 2007 Clausura champion
 Atlante – 2007 Apertura champion
 Houston Dynamo – 2007 MLS Cup champion
 D.C. United – 2007 MLS Supporters' Shield winner

Central American zone
 Motagua – 2007 UNCAF Interclub Cup winners
 Saprissa – 2007 UNCAF Interclub Cup runner-up
 Municipal – 2007 UNCAF Interclub Cup third place

Caribbean zone
 Harbour View – 2007 CFU Club Championship winner

Bracket

Quarterfinals

Houston Dynamo won 3–1 on aggregate.

Saprissa won 4–2 on aggregate.

Pachuca won 1–0 on aggregate.

D.C. United won 6–1 on aggregate.

Semifinals

Saprissa won 3–0 on aggregate.

Pachuca won 3–2 on aggregate.

Final

First leg

Second leg

''Pachuca won the 2008 CONCACAF Champions' Cup 3–2 on aggregate, advanced to the 2008 FIFA Club World Cup.

Champion

Top scorers

Notes

1
CONCACAF Champions' Cup
c
c